Eupithecia denticulata is a moth in the  family Geometridae. It is found in France, Germany, Switzerland, Italy, Poland, Slovakia, Hungary, Ukraine, Romania, Bulgaria and Serbia.

References

External links
Lepiforum.de

Moths described in 1828
denticulata
Moths of Europe
Taxa named by Georg Friedrich Treitschke